Star Rugby Club is an amateur rugby club based in Southland, New Zealand. The club's senior team plays in the Southlandwide Premier Division for the Galbraith Shield. The club, which celebrated its 125th anniversary in 2011, has been home to three Southland centurions and a number of All Blacks.

125th Anniversary Team
The club's 125th anniversary team was selected in 2011 by life members Bob Donnelly, Alan Blackler and Southland Times journalist Logan Savory. The team which included seven All Blacks was as follows:
15. Brian McKechnie
14. Mana Harrison
13. Billy Stead
12. John "Darky" Beazley
11. Lindsay Booth
10. James "Wampy" Bell
9. Alan Blackler
8. Bob Barber
7. John Hardie
6. Francis Glasgow
5. George Purdue
4. Josh Bekhuis
3. Brad Leonard
2. Corey Flynn
1. Phil "Scruffy" Butt

References

New Zealand rugby union teams
Sport in Invercargill
Organisations based in Invercargill